Alexandre Pliușchin (born 13 January 1987) is a Moldovan former professional road bicycle racer, who rode professionally between 2008 and 2015. He is a four-time National Road Race Champion; winning in 2008, 2010, 2011 and 2012. Pliuschin also represented Moldova in the 2008 Olympic Games in Beijing, having participated in the Men's Road Race and the Men's Individual Pursuit.

Major results

2004
 3rd  Scratch, UCI Junior Track World Championships
 6th Time trial, UCI Junior Road World Championships
2005
 1st Classique des Alpes
 2nd  Time trial, UCI Juniors World Championships
 2nd Overall Giro della Toscana
2006
 9th Overall Grand Prix Guillaume Tell
2007
 1st Ronde Van Vlaanderen Beloften
 1st Stage 2 Grand Prix Guillaume Tell
 1st Mountains classification Grand Prix du Portugal
 3rd  Road race, UCI B World Championships
 8th Time trial, UCI Under-23 Road World Championships
2008
 1st  National Road Championships
 10th Overall Ster Elektrotoer
2010
 1st  National Road Championships
 1st Duo Normand (with Artem Ovechkin)
2011
 1st  National Road Championships
2012
 1st  National Road Championships
 2nd Overall Tour Alsace
 3rd Overall Tour de Normandie
 3rd Overall Boucles de la Mayenne
 7th Overall Flèche du Sud
 8th Overall Le Triptyque des Monts et Châteaux
 9th Duo Normand (with Fábio Silvestre)
2014
 1st  Overall Sharjah International Cycling Tour
1st Points classification
1st Stages 1 & 3
 1st Melaka Governor's Cup

References

External links

 
 Palmarès by cyclingbase.com 

Moldovan male cyclists
1987 births
Living people
Cyclists at the 2008 Summer Olympics
Olympic cyclists of Moldova
Doping cases in cycling